The First Chapter or The 1st Chapter may refer to:

The First Chapter (The Mission album), 1987 and 2007 
The First Chapter (Nastyboy Klick album), 1997 
The First Chapter (EP), 2004 EP, by Dream Evil
The First Chapter (video album), 1985, video equivalent of The Age of Consent album by Bronski Beat
The 1st Chapter (album), 2005, by Circus Maximus

See also
Chapter One (disambiguation)